Rongowhakaata is a Māori iwi of the Gisborne region of New Zealand.

Hapū and marae
There are three primary hapū (subtribes) of Rongowhakaata today: Ngati Kaipoho, Ngai Tawhiri and Ngati Maru.

Ngāti Kaipoho
Ngāti Kaipoho descend from Kaipoho, the son of Whare (also known as Whare-rau-o-te-tahinga) and great-grandson of Rongomairatahi.

Kaipoho built Tapui pa on the west bank of Te Arai River, he also had a fishing settlement at Te Kowhai, near pakirikiri (what is now known as "Browns Beach"). Kaipoho was killed in battle and later avenged by his son Te Aweawe, who took over Tapui Pa. Ngati Kaipoho at one time fought against Ngati Maru and caused Ngati Maru's exodus from Waiapu, where they had lived for a time.

The Marae of Ngati Kaipoho And Ngati Aweawe today is called Manutuke marae which is situated on the Manutuke 1, C, E4 blocks. There are two meeting houses situated on Manutuke Marae Te Poho o Rukupo, and Te Poho o Epeha  The marae received a makeover in a 2006 episode of the Māori Television reality TV show Marae DIY. The show's creator and co-creator Nevak Ilolahia Rogers, has Rongowhakaata ancestry.

Ngāi Tāwhiri
Ngāi Tāwhiri are descended from Rongomairatahi through the three children of his granddaughter, Rongomaimihiao. Rongomaimihiao had two sons, Tawhirimatea and Tutekiki, and a daughter Materoa. The hapū has two marae: Ohako marae on which stands the house named Te Kiko o te Rangi in Manutuke, and Te Kurī a Tuatai marae, Whareroa meeting house and Awapuni Pā in Gisborne.

Te Puni Kōkiri recognises two hapū which share marae with Ngāi Tāwhiri:
 Ruapani hapū, which shares Ohako and Te Kurī a Tuatai marae
 Te Whānau a Iwi, which shares Te Kurī a Tuatai marae

Ngāti Maru
Ngāti Maru of Turanga trace their descent from Tapuhere and Tahatuoterangi. The tribal name is taken from Te Papa o Maruwhakatipua, a place where the chief named Uenuku once lived at a house called Te Poho o Maru. Taharakau, a famous chief of Ngati Maru, was known for his proverbial sayings. Ngāti Maru is not related to other tribes with the same name in Hauraki and Taranaki.

The hapū has two marae in Manutuke. One marae is called Pāhou, and includes Te Poho o Taharakau meeting house. The other is named Whakato, and includes Te Mana o Turanga meeting house.

Governance
Rongowhakaata Iwi Trust manages the tribe's Treaty of Waitangi settlement under the Rongowhakaata Claims Settlement Act. It also represents the iwi under the Māori Fisheries Act and Māori Commercial Aquaculture Claims Settlement Act, and is the iwi authority for resource consent consultation under the Resource Management Act. The charitable trust is governed by one trustee from each of the five marae and three iwi elected trustees and is chaired by Moera Brown.

The tribal area of the iwi is in the territory of Gisborne District Council, which performs of the function of both a district and regional council.

About
The ancestor called Rongowhakaata came to the Tūranga region from further north, Ūawa (Tolaga Bay). He had three wives Tūrāhiri, Uetūpuke and Moetai. The son of Rongowhakaata and Tūāhiri is Rongomairātahi.

The iwi describes the name Rongowhataata in the book that accompanies their Iwi-in-Residence exhibition at New Zealand's national museum Te Papa Tongarewa (2017-2020). "It combines 'rongo', to open the senses, with 'whakaata' to show or reflect - describing the transition of thought to form: the elements of creation." Central to the Rongowhakaata Iwi-In-Residence exhibition is the carved meeting house Te Hau ki Tūranga, which after 150 years was returned to the iwi from the Crown in the Rongowhakaata Treaty claim in 2011.

Media

Turanga FM
Turanga FM is the radio station of Turanganui-a-kiwa iwi, including Rongowhakaata, Te Aitanga-a-Māhaki and Ngai Tamanuhiri.

See also 

List of Māori iwi

References

External links
 Official iwi website

 
Gisborne District
Iwi and hapū